
Year 219 (CCXIX) was a common year starting on Friday (link will display the full calendar) of the Julian calendar. At the time, it was known as the Year of the Consulship of Antonius and Sacerdos (or, less frequently, year 972 Ab urbe condita). The denomination 219 for this year has been used since the early medieval period, when the Anno Domini calendar era became the prevalent method in Europe for naming years.

Events 
 By place 

 Roman Empire 
 Imperator Marcus Aurelius Antoninus Augustus (Elagabalus) and Quintus Tineius Sacerdos become Roman Consuls.
 Julia Maesa arranges, for her grandson Elagabalus, a marriage with Julia Paula. The wedding is a lavish ceremony and Paula is given the honorific title of Augusta.
 Legions III Gallica and IV Scythica are disbanded by Elagabalus after their leaders, Verus and Gellius Maximus, rebel.
 Emperor Elagabalus, age 15, is initiated into the worship of the Phrygian gods Cybele and Attis.

 India 
 The reign of Pulona, Satavahana king of Andhra, begins in India.

 China 
 The Battle of Mount Dingjun ends with Liu Bei emerging victorious. He declares himself king of Hanzhong afterwards.
 Guan Yu floods the fortress at Fan (present-day Fancheng District, Xiangyang, Hubei) in the Battle of Fancheng, while Lü Meng captures his base in Jing Province. Guan Yu retreats to Maicheng, falls into an ambush, and gets captured by Sun Quan's forces.
 Cao Cao controls the Yellow River basin and northern China. Sun Quan rules southern China. Liu Bei controls Yi Province (covering present-day Sichuan and Chongqing).
 Tuoba Liwei becomes the first chieftain of the Tuoba clan of the Xianbei people.

Births 
 Hua He (or Yongxian), Chinese official and historian (d. 278)
 Sun Jun (or Ziyuan), Chinese general and regent (d. 256)

Deaths 
 Jiang Qin (or Gongyi), Chinese general serving under Sun Quan
 Lu Ji (or Gongji), Chinese scholar, official and politician (b. 188)
 Marcus Munatius Sulla Cerialis, Roman governor and politician
 Pang De (or Lingming), Chinese general serving under Cao Cao
 Sima Fang (or Jianong), Chinese official and politician (b. 149)
 Sun Jiao (or Shulang), Chinese general serving under Sun Quan
 Xiahou Yuan (or Miaocai), Chinese general serving under Cao Cao
 Yang Xiu (or Dezi), Chinese official, adviser and chancellor (b. 175)
 Zhang Zhongjing, Chinese physician and pharmacologist (b. 150)

References